Gibbons Stamp Monthly (GSM) is a leading British philatelic magazine which can trace its roots back to 1890. GSM is published by the famous stamps and collectables firm of Stanley Gibbons and each issue includes updates to their various catalogues.

History 
In 1890 Charles James Phillips bought the business of Stanley Gibbons. Phillips was already producing and editing a philatelic journal called The Stamp Advertiser and Auction Record but that was soon replaced with the new Gibbons Monthly Journal.

In 1905 a new magazine was introduced, Gibbons Stamp Weekly, and in June 1908 the Journal was discontinued. However, producing a quality weekly magazine was too much, and in December 1910 the Weekly ceased and Gibbons Monthly Journal returned from January 1911 until it ceased with the outbreak of war in 1914.

Stanley Gibbons did not produce a journal during the First World War, but in September 1919 Stanley Gibbons Monthly Circular was introduced, which lasted for 49 issues. In October 1923 Stanley Gibbons Monthly Journal returned once again. The new Journal lasted until September 1927 when it was replaced by Gibbons Stamp Monthly from October 1927.

GSM did not close during World War Two, although it was much reduced in size, and the whole of the May 1941 issue was destroyed by enemy bombing, leading to an "Emergency Issue" being produced. Post-war paper rationing and electricity cuts were also a problem, and the staff sometimes had to work by candlelight.

The first all-colour cover was introduced in September 1963, and in 1967 an American sister journal was introduced named the Gibbons-Whitman Stamp Monthly but this ceased in 1969.

In June 1970 the word Gibbons was dropped from the title so that it became just Stamp Monthly but the old name was reinstated in June 1977. Apart from minor changes the magazine has continued in the same format since then.

Editors and contributors 
The contributors to the magazine over the years have included many of the most eminent philatelists from Britain and around the world.

The first two editions of the Monthly Journal were edited by Charles Phillips, after which Major Edward B. Evans took over.

The current editor of GSM is Dean Shepherd.

Availability 
The magazine is available from newsagents and by subscription or alternatively there is an archive of the magazine going back to 2010 online.

See also 
Edward Stanley Gibbons The person.
Stanley Gibbons The firm.

References

External links

Hugh Jefferies talking about the magazine.

English-language magazines
Hobby magazines published in the United Kingdom
Magazines established in 1890
Magazines published in London
Monthly magazines published in the United Kingdom
Philatelic periodicals
Stanley Gibbons